Julia Kowalczyk (born 30 September 1997) is a Polish judoka.

She won the gold medal in the women's 57 kg event at the 2018 European U23 Judo Championships held in Győr, Hungary.

She won a medal at the 2019 World Judo Championships.

In 2021, she won one of the bronze medals in her event at the Judo Grand Slam Antalya held in Antalya, Turkey. In June 2021, she competed in the women's 57 kg event at the World Judo Championships held in Budapest, Hungary.

She competed in the women's 57 kg event at the 2020 Summer Olympics held in Tokyo, Japan.

References

External links
 
 

1997 births
Living people
Polish female judoka
European Games competitors for Poland
Judoka at the 2019 European Games
Judoka at the 2020 Summer Olympics
Olympic judoka of Poland
21st-century Polish women